Caroline Stouffer is an American Democratic politician from Hingham, Massachusetts. She represented the First Plymouth district in the Massachusetts House of Representatives from 1977-1978.

References

Year of birth missing
Year of death missing
Members of the Massachusetts House of Representatives
Women state legislators in Massachusetts
20th-century American women politicians
20th-century American politicians
People from Hingham, Massachusetts